Essential Records was the name of two record companies:

 Essential Records (London), a subsidiary of London Records
 Essential Records (Christian), a Christian subsidiary of Sony BMG Music Entertainment